is a train station in Moji ward of Kitakyushu, Fukuoka Prefecture, Japan. It is on the Mojikō Retro Scenic Line, a heritage railway operated by the Heisei Chikuhō Railway.

Overview
Only a single four-car passenger train named the  serves this station, operating between March and November. Except for certain weeks, trains only operate on the weekends and holidays. Eleven round-trip services are run per day at 40-minute intervals.

External links
Norfolk Hiroba Station (Mojikō Retro Scenic Line website)

References

Railway stations in Fukuoka Prefecture
Railway stations in Japan opened in 2009
Mojikō Retro Scenic Line